Snow's BBQ is a renowned Texas barbecue restaurant located in the small town of Lexington roughly an hour outside of Austin, Texas to the east. Snow's is open only on Saturdays from 8 AM until they run out of meat, which is often around noon. The unusual hours were originally kept to take advantage of a weekly Saturday livestock auction that takes place nearby at 12:30 PM.

The name comes from owner Kerry Bexley's lifelong nickname. As Bexley told it: 

In May 2008, Texas Monthly rated Snow's BBQ as the number-one BBQ joint in Texas. In May 2013, Snow's was ranked number 2 on the magazine's Top 50 list of the best barbecue in Texas. The 2017 list saw Snow's trade places with Austin's Franklin Barbecue to retake the number 1 position. In early 2018, 82-year-old pitmaster Tootsie Tomanetz was nominated as a semifinalist for a James Beard Award.

Snow's BBQ has also been labeled as "The Best Texas BBQ in the World" by The New Yorker in its article titled "By Meat Alone" written by Calvin Trillin in the November 24, 2008, issue.

Snow's BBQ received a significant amount of publicity because of the 2020 Netflix series, Chef's Table: BBQ, episode 1 of which showcased Snow's BBQ and the story of Tootsie Tomanetz, the pitmaster responsible for the cooking.

See also
 List of barbecue restaurants

References

External links
Official website

Restaurants in Texas
Restaurants established in 2003
Buildings and structures in Lee County, Texas
Tourist attractions in Lee County, Texas
2003 establishments in Texas
Barbecue restaurants in Texas